Thaddeus Michael Machrowicz (August 21, 1899 – February 17, 1970) was a United States representative from Michigan and later was a United States district judge of the United States District Court for the Eastern District of Michigan.

Education and career

Born in Gostyń in Prussia's Province of Posen (in modern-day Poland), Machrowicz immigrated to the United States with his parents in 1902 and the family settled in Chicago, Illinois, later moving to Milwaukee, Wisconsin. He was naturalized as a Citizen of the United States in 1910. He attended a parochial school in Milwaukee. He then attended Alliance College in Cambridge Springs, Pennsylvania from 1912 to 1916, and the University of Chicago in 1917. During the First World War, he served as a lieutenant in the Polish Army of American Volunteers in Canada, France and Poland from 1917 to 1920. He served with the American Advisory Commission to Polish Government in 1920 and 1921 and also acted as war correspondent with Floyd Gibbons in Poland from 1919 to 1921. He attended De Paul University in 1921. He received a Bachelor of Laws from Detroit College of Law (now Michigan State University College of Law) in 1924 and was admitted to the Michigan Bar the same year. He was in private practice of law in Detroit, Michigan, from 1924 to 1934. He was city attorney of Hamtramck, Michigan, from 1934 to 1936. He was legal director of the Michigan Public Utilities Commission from 1938 to 1939. He returned to private practice in Hamtramck from 1939 to 1942. He was a municipal judge for Hamtramck from 1942 to 1950. He was a delegate to the Democratic National Convention from Michigan in 1952 and 1956.

Congressional service

Machrowicz was elected as a Democrat to the 82nd Congress and to the five succeeding Congresses and served from January 3, 1951, to September 18, 1961, when he resigned to accept appointment to the federal bench.

Federal judicial service

Machrowicz was nominated by President John F. Kennedy on August 25, 1961, to a seat on the United States District Court for the Eastern District of Michigan vacated by Judge Frank Albert Picard. He was confirmed by the United States Senate on September 1, 1961, and received his commission on September 7, 1961. His service was terminated on February 17, 1970, due to his death in Bloomfield Township, Oakland County, Michigan. He was interred in Mount Olivet Cemetery in Detroit.

References

Sources

Thaddeus M. Machrowicz at The Political Graveyard
Thaddeus M. Machrowicz at the Federal Judicial Center

1899 births
1970 deaths
Democratic Party members of the United States House of Representatives from Michigan
Michigan state court judges
Polish emigrants to the United States
Judges of the United States District Court for the Eastern District of Michigan
United States district court judges appointed by John F. Kennedy
20th-century American judges
20th-century American lawyers
Michigan lawyers
Municipal judges in the United States
City and town attorneys in the United States
People from Hamtramck, Michigan
People from Gostyń